Dos hogares (English title: Two Homes, Double Life) is a Spanish-language Mexican drama thriller telenovela produced by Emilio Larrosa for Televisa in 2011.

Anahí, Carlos Ponce and Sergio Goyri starred as protagonists, while Alfredo Adame, Jorge Ortiz de Pinedo,  Olivia Collins, Malillany Marín and Joana Benedek starred as antagonists.

History
Canal de las Estrellas aired Dos Hogares from June 27, 2011 to January 20, 2012, with Abismo de Pasión replacing it. From October 31, 2011 to May 29, 2012., Univision broadcast Dos Hogares at 3pm central, replacing one hour of Ni Contigo Ni Sin Ti.

Plot
Angélica Estrada (Anahí) is a veterinarian committed to her job. She is engaged to Santiago Ballesteros (Carlos Ponce), a young and good-looking architect. She lives with her mother and her brother, Jorge.

Santiago's mother, widow Patricia Ortiz Monasterio (Olivia Collins), doesn't like Angelica and wants Santiago to marry Jennifer (Malillany Marin), Armando Garza's (Alfredo Adame) daughter. Her other son, Claudio (Abraham Ramos), studies Law. Patricia and Ricardo Valtierra (Sergio Goyri) are lovers. In the past, Ricardo was married to Yolanda Rivapalacio (Joana Benedek) but they divorced after Yolanda cheated on him with a man.

Ricardo is the main shareholder at a food company entitled Grupo KNG. Armando, Patricia and he are all members of the Board of Directors of this company. Armando Garza wants to take revenge on Ricardo Valtierra because his father went into bankruptcy and committed suicide because of Ricardo's father.

Angélica marries Santiago. Soon after, Santiago suffers an accident and disappears, being declared "officially dead". Jennifer dates Jorge. Dario Colmenares (Victor Noriega) is Yolanda's lover but he also likes Pamela (Maya Mishalska). Refugio (Laura Leon) is married to Cristobal (Jorge Ortiz de Pinedo) and they have a son named Oscar and a daughter named Cristina. Cristobal is polygamous and he has another wife named Mara with whom he has a boy and a girl, and a mistress called Dayana. Cristina works with Claudio and they start dating.

After two years of mourning, Angélica finds love in Ricardo Valtierra. Ricardo breaks up with Patricia and marries Angélica. Pamela falls in love with Ricardo. Patricia starts dating Armando. Cristobal gets married for the third time, with Dayana. Ricardo and Angélica return from their honeymoon because his mother suffered a stroke. Yolanda claims back her actions at Grupo KNG from Ricardo and she becomes the main shareholder. She is still in love with him. In San Antonio, Texas, Oscar starts dating Dayana.

Santiago reappears and tries to recover his life and Angélica's heart. Angélica now faces a big dilemma: she is married to two different men, both of whom she loves and needs. Santiago suffers from amnesia and lives with a woman named Flor Lopez who loves him. They met in the village where Santiago was found by a woman after his accident. Angelica allows them to stay together and pays for his recovery treatment but she doesn't tell him she's also married to Ricardo. She hides him and doesn't tell the others that he is alive.

Armando hires a woman called Abril to make Jorge fall in love with her and separate him and Jennifer. Dario Colmenares is elected president of the Board of Directors of Grupo KNG but the company faces financial problems and loses millions of pesos because of a fraud committed by Cristobal, Pamela and her step-father Eleazar. Ricardo is presumed guilty by Armando and his rights in the company are canceled by the members of the Board. Dario resigns. Armando becomes president of Grupo KNG. Mara turns out to be Yolanda's cousin. Mara, together with her children, abandons the house where she used to live with Cristobal, goes to Ciudad de Mexico, and becomes Yolanda's personal assistant.

Ricardo is arrested for the fraud at Grupo KNG. Patricia offers him her help to get out of prison in exchange of him leaving Angelica. He declines. By coincidence, Cristina becomes Ricardo's lawyer. Jennifer meets Santiago and afterwards tells Patricia, Claudio and others that he is alive and hidden by Angelica but nobody believes her. Adela, an ex-student of Santiago who is in love with him, discovers that he is alive and starts dating him. Ricardo is released from prison. Jennifer and Dario start dating but she has a one-night stand with Jorge. Ricardo sees Yolanda and Armando kissing in an office. Armando tells him that she cheated on him with Armando. They fight.

Jennifer confesses to Jorge that she dates Dario. Dario and Jorge get into a fight. Cristobal's brother loves Refugio and helps her to become a singer. Claudio and Karina had an affair and she got pregnant. He does not want to marry her. Santiago moves in the same block of flats where Refugio and her family live. One day he hears noise in Refugio's apartment as Servando, a man that Cristina dated for a while, was about to rape Cristina and he saves her. Patricia hires Julian to follow Angelica. He sees her with Santiago and he blackmails her to give him more money than Patricia to keep silence. Jorge wants to shoot Dario but it is he who is injured. Eventually, Julian tells Patricia that her son is alive. Angelica has to choose between her love with Santiago or Ricardo. She chooses Ricardo after Santiago starts dating her godmother's niece Adela. She goes live with Ricardo in his ranch. Unfortunately, Refugio finds out that Cristobal her husband has two other wives, makes him leave the house. Claudio proposes to Cristina and she accepts however when they tell the news to Patricia she lies and says they can't because they're siblings. Heartbroken Cristina and Claudio go do a DNA test, the results turn out negative.

They decide marry since they aren't siblings. Santiaho has trouble loving Adela since he still thinks of Angelica. Jorge goes missing who makes his mom heartbroken.  Cristina and Claudio marry and go to their honeymoon. At the ranch, Angelica does what she can so Ricardo isn't in danger due to a bad guys who want rob Ricardo ranch since they heard there is a secret area in the ranch that has gold. Jennifer dad Armando teams up with them to avenge his dad's death which has nothing to do with Ricardo his dad chose to end his life and blames Ricardo instead. At Angelicas wedding to Ricardo, Ricardo gets shot and dies. Heartbroken, Angelica reconnects with Santigo which Adela left him realizing he will always love Angelica. They get married and have two children.

Cast

Main
Anahí as Angélica Estrada
Carlos Ponce as Santiago Ballesteros
Sergio Goyri as Ricardo Valtierra
Olivia Collins as Patricia Ortiz Monasterio Ballesteros
Alfredo Adame as Armando Garza
Laura León as Refugio Urbina
Jorge Ortiz de Pinedo as Cristóbal Lagos/Chris Lakes
Joana Benedek as Yolanda Rivapalacio

Recurring
Víctor Noriega as Darío Colmenares
Claudia Álvarez as Adela Arismendi
Maya Mishalska as Pamela Ramos
Theo Tapia  as Enrique Arismendi
Marcus Ornelas as Javier
Lorena Velázquez as Carmela de Valtierra
Miguel Palmer as Hernán Colmenares
Mariana Huerdo as Xochitl
Carlos Bonavides as Eleazar Pérez
Abraham Ramos as Claudio Ballesteros
Malillany Marín as Jennifer Garza Larrazábal
Lalo "El Mimo" as Gaspar Rincón
Gabriela Carrillo as Cristina Lagos
Pablo Magallanes as Óscar Lagos
Silvia Manríquez as Amparo Mejía
Maribel Fernández as Enriqueta "Queta" Sánchez
Érika García as Flor Lopez

Guest cast 

Pietro Vanucci as Alexander Vadín
Marisol Santacruz as Mara Sevedo
Ana Bekoa as Dayana Díaz
Arturo Vázquez as Julián Martínez
Gabriela Goldsmith as Verónica Larrazábal
José Carlos Femat as Jorge Estrada
Hugo Aceves as Luis Miguel Sánchez "El Ojos Verdes"
Roberto Tello as Rodolfo de la Colina
Mauricio García Muela as Mauricio Pérez
Benjamin Rivero as Braulio
Elizabeth Valdez as Beatriz Noriega
Lola Merino as Juana Maria
José Luis Cordero as Mario
Rudy Casanova as Don Fidel
Luis Felipe Montoya as "El Charal"
Mundo Siller as "El Jagger"
Marco Uriel as Baldomero Lagos
Alfredo Alfonso as Julio Cesar Palma
Sergio Acosta as Cornelio Mendoza
Diana Golden as Paola Diaz
Javier Herranz as Leopoldo Garcia
Diana Villa as Gardenia
Ivonne Ley as Jacinta
Xorge Noble as Filemon
Carlos Miguel as Goyo
Rogelio Guerra as Rodrigo Valtierra
Esteban Franco as Artemio "El Lagarto"
Yolanda Ciani as Martha de Colmenares
Manuel Landeta as Ernesto
Edith Kleiman as Dolores
Archie Lafranco as Servando Uriostegui
Dobrina Cristeva as Sofía
Silvia Váldez as Abril
Emma Escalante as Karina
Eduardo de Guise as Octavio
David Rencoret 
Marco Munoz as Esteban
Felipe Najera as Guillermo
Alberto Estrella

Awards and nominations

References

External links
 
  

2011 telenovelas
2011 Mexican television series debuts
2012 Mexican television series endings
Spanish-language telenovelas
Television shows set in Mexico City
Television shows set in Texas
Mexican telenovelas
Televisa telenovelas